The 1892 Texas gubernatorial election was held to elect the Governor of Texas. Incumbent Governor Jim Hogg was re-elected to a second term with a plurality of the vote over George W. Clark, an independent Democrat with the backing of the Republican Party and state railroad interests, and Populist judge T. L. Nugent.

General election

Candidates
George W. Clark, railroad attorney and former Texas Attorney General (Independent Democrat)
Jim Hogg, incumbent Governor (Democratic)
Andrew Jackson Houston, U.S. Marshal for the Eastern District of Texas (Lily White Republican)
Thomas Lewis Nugent, former judge (Populist)

Results

References

1892
Texas
1892 Texas elections